Thomas E. Eccleston Jr. (1910 – December 20, 2000) was an American ice hockey, football and baseball coach. Eccleston spent most of his career at Burrillville High School in some capacity but was also the head coach for Providence for eight seasons.

Career
Tom Eccleston graduated from Brown University in 1932, playing four years of soccer, and immediately moved into a teaching position at Burrillville High in Burrillville, Rhode Island. Initially a history teacher and football coach, Eccleston eventually added the coaching duties of baseball and ice hockey to his responsibilities, winning state championships in all three sports. For 23 years Eccleston declined all offers to coach at the collegiate level but finally accepted an offer from Providence in 1956 to alleviate issues that had arisen while coaching his sons.

Eccleston became the fifth head coach at Providence (the second since the program restarted after World War II) and immediately provided the school with its best record in 1956-57 at 11-7. Eccleston continued to keep the Friars in a strong position for the duration of his tenure, including its transition into ECAC Hockey in the early 1960s, recruiting players like Lou Lamoriello, Bob Bellemore and Larry Kish. In eight seasons behind the bench Eccleston had only one losing season and in 1963-64 gave Providence its first conference title and NCAA tournament appearance. The '64 season was the best in Providence's history to that point and very few have topped it. For the outstanding year Eccleston received the Spencer Penrose Award and then stepped down from his position to devote more attention to being the school superintendent in Burrillville.

In 1987, after 32 years away, Eccleston returned to Burrillville High to coach the ice hockey team when it was in jeopardy and revived the program. He was enshrined in the Rhode Island Hockey Hall of Fame in 2019.

Head coaching record

References

External links
Tom Eccleston career record at College Hockey News

Rhode Island Heritage Hall of Fame

1910 births
2000 deaths
American ice hockey coaches
High school baseball coaches in the United States
High school football coaches in Rhode Island
High school ice hockey coaches in the United States
Providence Friars men's ice hockey coaches